Among the numerous literary works titled Selected Essays are the following:

Selected Essays (Frederick Douglass) by Frederick Douglass
Selected Essays (T. S. Eliot) by T. S. Eliot
Selected Essays (William Troy) by William Troy